The Galicia tournament is the previous round of the Copa RFEF in Galicia. Organized by the Galician Football Federation, the Regional teams in Segunda División B and the best teams of the Tercera División (Group 3) not qualified to the Copa del Rey play this tournament, including farm teams.

It is usually played between July and October, and the champion of the tournament qualifies to the National tournament of the Copa RFEF.

Format
The tournament is played usually as a knock-out tournament.

History

Champions

References

External links
Galician Football Federation
Copa Federación at RSSSF.com

Football in Galicia (Spain)
Galicia